Ammar Riad Abduljabbar (born 1 October 1995) is a German boxer. He competed in the men's heavyweight event at the 2020 Summer Olympics.

A native of Iraq, he moved to Hamburg in 2010 and became a German citizen in 2018.

References

External links
 

1995 births
Living people
German male boxers
Olympic boxers of Germany
Boxers at the 2020 Summer Olympics
German people of Iraqi descent
Iraqi emigrants to Germany
Naturalized citizens of Germany
Sportspeople from Hamburg